Money Heist , (Original soundtrack from the Netflix Original Series) is the official soundtrack for the TV series Money Heist featuring various artists, released by RCA Records on 10 June 2017.

Songs

Part 1

Part 2

Episode 1 
 Bella Ciao, Modena City Ramblers
 Por una Cabeza, Carlos Gardel
 Tokio y Berlín Venganza 4, Ivan M. Lacamara and Manel Santisteban

Episode 2 
 Fuerte y claro, Bob Bradley, Matt Sanchez and Steve Dymond
 Tu amor, Kosinus music

Episode 5 
 Verde Que Te Quiero Verde (La casa de papel), Amparo Lagares (singer); lyrics from Romance Sonámbulo by Federico García Lorca

Part 3

Episode 1 
 Mi vida continúa, Cecilia Krull
 La Flor y el Libro, La Fanfarria del Capitán
 Zona Timebomb, The Prodigy
 El Preso, Fruko y Sus Tesos
 Bastante sucio, buena gente

Episode 2 
 My Life Is Going On (Original music from the TV Series Money Heist), Cecilia Krull
 ¿Quién puede ser ahora?, Hombres trabajando
 Harlem Shuffle (Toma alternativa), Los fundamentos
 Nunca caminarás solo, Gerry & The Pacemakers

Episode 3 
 Sentirse bien, Alex Almedo
 Otro día soleado, Belle and Sebastian
 Guajira Guantanamera, Compay Segundo

Episode 4 
 Lonely Boy, The Black Keys

Episode 5 
 Rocas, Grito primigenio
 Be My Baby, Las Ronettes
 Alza, Anthony Ranere

Episode 6 
 María, Mi Vida, Mi Amor, Paco Tous and Jaime Lorente
 Electro Metal Trailer (feat. Antoine Binant and Julien Ranouil, Sonido para producción
 Litoral roto, Abajo como plata

Episode 7 
 Te quiero rubia australiana
 Di doo dah, Jane Birkin
 La poupée, Conjunto de Les Très Bien

Episode 8 
 La Deriva, Vetusta Morla
 Bella Ciao (Orchestral Version of the Original Music from the Money Heist), Manu Pilas

Part 4

Episode 1 
 Ti amo, Umberto Tozzi
 My Life Is Going On (Original music from the TV Series Money Heist), Cecilia Krull
 Maskenfreiheit, Belako
 Te Estoy Amando Locamente, Las Grecas

Episode 2 
 Sweetheart, Music Beyond
 Días como este, Van Morrison
 Centro di gravità permanente, Franco Battiato
 Asalto Camion, Ivan M. Lacamara, Manel Santsteban

Episode 3 
 Todo lo que necesitas saber, Howe Gelb
 Los Putos Amos, Ivan M. Lacamara, Manel Santisteban
 Siempre Nos Quedara El C4, Ivan M. Lacamara, Manel Santisteban
 Asalto Camion, Ivan M. Lacamara, Manel Santisteban
 La Bamba, Ritchie Valens
 Dos Gardenias, Buena Vista Social Club

Episode 4 
 Amado Mio, Martini Rosa
 Suspiros de España (Pasodoble), Real Orquesta Sinfónica de Sevilla, Folklore Español

Episode 5 
 Fuego, Bomba Estéreo
 La Palloza, La Fanfarria del Capitán

Episode 6 
 Delicate, Damien Rice
 Pescador De Hombres, Cesáreo Gabaráin

Episode 7 
 Wake Up, Arcade Fire
 Raquel y Sergio Juntos, Ivan M. Lacamara, Manel Santisteban
 Cuando Suba La Marea, Amaral

Episode 8 
 Bella ciao, Najwa
 Ni Sueño ni Amor sin Ti, SaraoMusic
 Alma empedrada, Janice Dempsey and Steve Sechi

References

External links 
 Money Heist soundtrack at Spotify

2017 soundtrack albums
Disco soundtracks
Soundtrack
Television soundtracks